The Kanon Award is one of the movie awards of Norwegian film festival Kosmorama. Every year during Kosmorama, the Kanon Award is given to a selected individual within a category. The categories include Best Actor, Best Director and Best Producer.

Categories 
Best Director

Best Producer

Best Main Actor

Best Supporting Actor

Best Cinematographer

Best Writer

Best Editing

Best Sound Design

Best Soundtrack

Best Innovation

People's Choice Award

The Kanon Award 2005 
Best Director: Hans Petter Moland - The Beautiful Country

Best Writer: Aksel Hennie - Uno

Best Editing: Einar Egeland - Hawaii, Oslo

Best Cinematographer: John Andreas Andersen - Uno

Best Main Actor: Aksel Hennie - Uno

Best Supporting Actor: Stig Henrik Hoff - "Hawaii, Oslo"

Best Producer: Jørgen Storm Rosenberg - Uno

People's Choice Award: Uno

The Kanon Award 2006 
Best Director: Sara Johnsen - Vinterkyss

Best Sound Design: Christian Schaanning - Naboer

Best Cinematographer: Odd Reinhard Nicolaisen - "Vinterkyss"

Best Soundtrack: Kristin Asbjørnsen - Factotum

Best Writer: Ståle Stein Berg and Sara Johnsen - "Vinterkyss"

Best Supporting Actor: Jan Sælid - Izzat

Best Editing: Zaklina Stojcevska - "Vinterkyss"

Best Main Actor: Helen Wikstvedt - 37 1/2

Best Producer: Christian Fredrik Martin and Asle Vatn - "Vinterkyss"

People's Choice Award: "Izzat"

The Kanon Award 2007 
Best Director: Joachim Trier - Reprise

Best Producer: Martin Sundland and Magne Lyngner - Fritt Vilt

Best Main Actor: Trond Fausa Aurvåg - Den brysomme mannen

Best Supporting Actor: Henrik Mestad - Sønner

Best Cinematographer: John Christian Rosenlund - "Den brysomme mannen"

Best Writer: Per Schreiner - "Den brysomme mannen"

Best Editing: Olivier Bugge Couté - "Reprise"

Best Sound Design: Christian Schaanning - "Fritt Vilt"

Best Soundtrack: Simon Boswell - Slipp Jimmy Fri

Best Innovation: Production Designer Are Sjaastad and Cinematographer John Christian Rosenlund won the award for the visuals of the universe in "Den brysomme mannen".

People's Choice Award: "Slipp Jimmy Fri"

References 

Norwegian film awards